Coill Dubh Hurling Club is a Gaelic Athletic Association (GAA) club in County Kildare, Ireland, winner of eleven senior hurling championships. Three Coill Dubh players, Seamus Malone, Tony Carew and Tommy Carew were chosen on the Kildare hurling team of the millennium. The club played in every county final between 1990 and 2005 with the exception of 1992. Colm Byrne was selected on the Leinster hurling squad in 1997.

History
Timahoe participated in the reorganization of 1894. Coill Dubh was the largest Bord na Móna village built in Ireland and the only one on a green field site, and shortly after construction the GAA club was established in 1957 by Tom Murtagh from Longford and Vinny O’Rourke from Leitrim. The club almost went out of existence in the early 1980s but came to dominate hurling in Kildare in the 1990s. From 1990 to 2005 the club contest the senior hurling final on every occasion bar 1992.

In 1993 they won an All Ireland under-16 competition, beating Offaly’s Kilcormac-Killoughey in the final.

Gaelic Football
The Gaelic football wing of the club lasted very few years. Local players now play with St. Kevin's, Allenwood, Caragh and Ballyteague.

Hurling 
The first championship was won by the under-15s in 1961, led by Tony and Tommy Carew and Willie Percival. Morris Dee, Richie Hayden, Larry Kelly and Tony Carew, who featured on the team that won the Junior Hurling championship in 1968, were on the team that won its first senior hurling championship 19 years later.

Camogie
In 2013, Coill Dubh re-launched their Camogie Club. This was re-launched by Mairead and Eamon Dwyer.

Honours
 Kildare Senior Hurling Championship: (11) 1987, 1990, 1993, 1995, 1996, 1998, 1999, 2000, 2003, 2014, 2015
 Kildare Senior Hurling Championship: Finalists 1988, 1991, 1994, 1997, 2001, 2002, 2004, 2005, 2007
 Kildare Junior Hurling Championship (1)  1968
Kildare Junior A Hurling Championship (2) 2015, 2016

Bibliography
 Kildare GAA: A Centenary History, by Eoghan Corry, CLG Chill Dara, 1984,  hb  pb
 Kildare GAA yearbook, 1972, 1974, 1978, 1979, 1980 and 2000- in sequence especially the Millennium yearbook of 2000
 Soaring Sliothars: Centenary of Kildare Camogie 1904-2004 by Joan O'Flynn Kildare County Camogie Board.

External links

Kildare GAA site
Kildare GAA club sites
Kildare on Hoganstand.com

Gaelic games clubs in County Kildare
Hurling clubs in County Kildare